German for Kids - Sprich mit! (German for Kids) is an educational film for children and an award-winning introduction to the German language.

Plot
9-year-old Elias and his father are going for a walk in Berlin. Suddenly, Elias loses sight of his father. This is the start of an adventurous journey through the capital. But Elias has a problem: He doesn't speak German! 
Fortunately, many people help him with his search and teach him basic lessons of the German language. Elias learns how to introduce himself, how to express feelings, names of food, the alphabet, the numbers from 1 to 10, and many other things...

Release
German for Kids premiered in Berlin on November 28, 2011.

The publishing house Lingua-Video.com released the film on DVD-ROM – licensed for educational purposes – in addition with 9 educational short films and a comprehensive study guide in November, 2011.

DVD
The DVD-ROM – licensed for educational purposes – is in three parts:

 Main feature (23 min.)
 9 educational short films (14 min.)
 A comprehensive study guide
 6 units with detailed teacher guidelines
 49 work sheets for different levels (self-explanatory)
 Wide variety of possible applications
 Interactive picture gallery 
 Script
 Links for further activities

Reception
German for Kids – in Germany released as Sprich mit! – has been widely acclaimed and recommended by German politics and media.

Awards
German for Kids has been awarded the Berlin prize for Integration and Tolerance 2011.

References

External links
 German for Kids Official Page and Trailer

2011 films
2010s German-language films
Language education materials
German children's films